Raya University is located at Maichew, Tigray at a distance of 668 km north of Addis Ababa along Ethiopian Highway 2 or 130 km south of Mekelle city.

History
Raya University was established by the Government of Ethiopia (Council of Ministers, Regulations No. 357/2016) as an autonomous higher education institution. The university has started its construction on June 7, 2016. Eighty-eight point five one percent(88.51%)  of the construction was completed in May 2017. The first phase construction was completed on July 7, 2017.
All necessary preparations are underway to enroll 1500 students in October 2017.

Colleges
Raya University has five colleges and 18 departments. The five colleges are: 
College of Natural and Computational Sciences (CNCS)
College of Agriculture and Natural Resources (CANR)
College of Business and Economics (CBE)
Colleges Social Sciences and Humanities (CSSH)
College of Engineering (EC)

References

External links
Raya University

Universities and colleges in Ethiopia
Tigray Region